Bukit Antarabangsa is a state constituency in Selangor, Malaysia, that has been represented in the Selangor State Legislative Assembly since 2004.

The state constituency was created in the 2003 redistribution and is mandated to return a single member to the Selangor State Legislative Assembly under the first past the post voting system. , the State Assemblyman for Bukit Antarabangsa is Mohamed Azmin Ali from BERSATU.

Demographics

History

Polling districts 
According to the gazette issued on 30 March 2018, the Bukit Antarabangsa constituency has a total of 19 polling districts.

Representation history

Election results

References

Selangor state constituencies